The Dark Frontier (1936) is Eric Ambler's first novel, about whose genesis he writes: "... Became press agent for film star, but soon after joined big London advertising agency as copywriter and 'ideas man'. During next few years wrote incessantly on variety of subjects ranging from baby food to non-ferrous alloys. Have travelled in most countries of Europe, been stranded in Marseilles and nearly drowned in the Bay of Naples. Decided, on a rainy day in Paris, to write a thriller. Result was The Dark Frontier."

Based on the development of weaponry in the year 1936, The Dark Frontier was one of the first novels to predict the invention of a nuclear bomb and its consequences. Ambler evidently had no knowledge of what producing an atomic bomb might involve. The book makes no mention of uranium or any other radioactive material, and makes instead the assumption that setting off an atomic bomb would involve a considerable electric charge. Still, Ambler could be credited with having become aware, before many others, of this coming weapon which was to have such a profound effect on the entire world, and his depiction of scientists in a secret hideout building such a bomb could be considered a preview of the Manhattan Project – and he correctly surmised that refugees from Nazi Germany might get involved in such a project.

Outline of the plot

The novel is set in 1934 or 1935 in Ixania, a small fictional country somewhere in a mountainous region of the Balkans bordering Romania. There, a peasant revolt succeeds in overthrowing the country's dictatorial regime and in establishing freedom and justice for all its citizens. Throughout modern history Ixania, a "God-forsaken country", has preserved its political independence because of its lack of natural resources and, generally, its comparative irrelevance in economic matters. However, due to the defection from Nazi Germany of Jacob Kassen, a nuclear scientist, the Countess Schverzinski and her brother, Prince Ladislaus, who effectively run the country, are in possession of a formula to build an atomic bomb (the "Kassen secret"), a fact they wish to exploit for their country's but also their own personal benefit.

Two groups of people want to prevent exactly that. There is Simon Groom, a representative of Messrs. Cator & Bliss Ltd., a British armament manufacturer, who is sent to Ixania to get hold of the Kassen secret by hook or by crook. He enlists the services of Professor Henry Barstow, an English physicist who is to travel with him to Ixania to determine whether the secret papers whose theft he plans to commission are authentic and worth the money.

However, Henry Barstow seems to be a cover name for Conway Carruthers, a Doc Savage-esque adventurerer who has realised that the Kassen secret poses "a serious menace to world peace" and who, accordingly, has made it his job to rid the world of that danger by destroying all copies of Kassen's papers. His mission is to prevent the manufacture of the bomb and to "preserve civilization". Carruthers's charismatic authority attracts the attention of William L. Casey, an American journalist stationed in Zovgorod, the capital of Ixania. Originally only interested in a good story, Casey becomes Carruthers's quasi-assistant, a change Casey himself describes as his "transition from newspaper man to desperado".

Siding with the peasant revolutionaries, Carruthers becomes the leader of the operation and thus the de facto leader of the peasants. On several occasions his and Casey's lives are in danger, repeatedly they are "standing in front of the wrong end of a gun", but it is always Carruthers's almost superhuman intelligence and skills that save them. Within only one day it turns out that, with the old government having stepped down, the revolution has been both successful and unbloody. Kassen is dead, and all copies of his secret except one have been destroyed. The one copy that has survived is Countess Schverzinski's, and she is driving her Mercedes at breakneck speed along a dark and narrow mountain road, with the only intention of fleeing the country. However, Carruthers and Casey are following her in Groom's car (which they have stolen), but before they can catch up with her and stop her vehicle she has an accident, is catapulted out of her car, and dies. The wreck of her Mercedes catches fire, so all Carruthers has to do when he arrives at the scene is retrieve the last remaining copy of the bomb-building manual from the Countess's body and cast it into the flames.

Reception

The novel was one of the first six of Ambler's books which made his name. Ambler wrote in his autobiography, "As I saw it, the thriller had nowhere to go but up".

The Dark Frontier parodies the conventions of the contemporary British thriller, particularly E. Phillips Oppenheim and John Buchan, but improves upon them.

See also

History of nuclear weapons

References

1936 British novels
Dystopian novels
Fictional European countries
Novels by Eric Ambler
Novels set in fictional countries
British thriller novels
1936 debut novels
Eastern Europe in fiction
Hodder & Stoughton books